Balekempa (translation: The Bangle Seller) is a 2018 Kannada drama film written and directed by Ere Gowda. Produced by Zoo Entertainment Pvt Ltd, the film is about the relationship between a travelling bangle seller and his wife. The film was included in the list of the ten most notable films at the International Film Festival Rotterdam.

Plot
Kempanna, the bangle seller, roams the countryside adorning the hands and faces of women with beauty products. Yet he seems to have little time for his own wife, Saubaghya. Indeed, the only activity that husband and wife do together is taking care of Kempanna's invalid mother. Otherwise, Kempanna seems to prefer the company of his childhood friend, Hanuma, in the quiet and private setting of Hanuma's farm. Meanwhile, Saubaghya's only companion is the neighbour's teenage son Mahesha, who delivers the milk and can't quite control his hormones. The now long married couple's inability to conceive is a concern for Saubaghya's mother who goes to the local deity and prays for the boon of a child. However, without Kempanna's participation, prayers have little effect.

When Saubaghya insists on getting a life insurance policy and disappears to her mother's house, Kempanna has to face what is really wrong with their marriage. For behind every frustration there seem to lurk burning desires. Who is concealing the greater secret - husband, or wife? While society watches, will a child be born?

Awards

References

External links
 

2018 films
Indian drama films
2010s Kannada-language films
2018 drama films